Aplus dorbignyi is a species of sea snail, a marine gastropod mollusk in the family Pisaniidae.

Description
The shell size varies between 10 mm and 20 mm. This shell is quite variable in pattern and shape. Usually it is quite elongated, with strong axial ribs. It shows a brown or yellowish background with paler nodules and one or two suprasutural white bands along the spirals. The interior is white.

The ovate, subfusiform shell is pointed at its summit. It is composed of eight very distinct whorls, a little swollen, ridged lengthwise by several subnodulous folds, covered also by transverse striae and ridges. The aperture is ovate, violet, edged with reddish, and narrowed at its base. The outer lip is deeply furrowed within. The columella is nearly straight, subgranular; rarely having a distinct fold at the base. The general color is brown, varied with fawn color, with a white zone at the base of each whorl, a broader decurrent band towards the middle of the body whorl.

Distribution
This species occurs in European waters, the Mediterranean Sea, the Red Sea and in the Atlantic Ocean off Mauritania. It lives under rocks at low tide,

References

 Vine, P. (1986). Red Sea Invertebrates. Immel Publishing, London. 224 pp. 
 Coen G. (1933). Saggio di una Sylloge Molluscorum Adriaticorum. Memorie del Regio Comitato Talassografico Italiano 192: pp. i–vii, 1–186
 Wolff, W.J.; Duiven, P.; Esselink, P.; Gueve, A. (1993). Biomass of macrobenthic tidal flat fauna of the Banc d'Arguin, Mauritania. Hydrobiologia 258(1–3): 151–163
 Gofas, S.; Le Renard, J.; Bouchet, P. (2001). Mollusca, in: Costello, M.J. et al. (Ed.) (2001). European register of marine species: a check-list of the marine species in Europe and a bibliography of guides to their identification. Collection Patrimoines Naturels, 50: pp. 180–213

External links
 Payraudeau B. C. (1826). Catalogue descriptif et méthodique des Annelides et des Mollusques de l'île de Corse. Paris, 218 pp. + 8 pl
 Costa O. G. (1830 ["1829"]) Catalogo sistematico e ragionato de' testacei delle Due Sicilie. Tipografia della Minerva, Napoli. pp. 1–8, i–cxxxii, pl. 1–3. 
 Risso A. (1826–1827). Histoire naturelle des principales productions de l'Europe Méridionale et particulièrement de celles des environs de Nice et des Alpes Maritimes. Paris, Levrault
 Monterosato T. A. (di) (1884). Nomenclatura generica e specifica di alcune conchiglie mediterranee. Palermo, Virzi, 152 pp
 Aissaoui C., Puillandre N., Bouchet P., Fassio G., Modica M.V. & Oliverio M. (2016). Cryptic diversity in Mediterranean gastropods of the genus Aplus (Neogastropoda: Buccinidae). Scientia Marina. 80(4): 521–533
 

Pisaniidae
Gastropods described in 1826